The Khoton people are a Turkic ethnic group in Mongolia. Most Khotons live in Uvs Province, especially in Tarialan, Naranbulag and Ulaangom. While Khotons spoke a Turkic language until the 19th century, the majority now speak the Dörbet dialect of the Oirat language. Khotons often avoid mainstream Mongolian written culture.
There were officially about 6,100 Khotons in 1989. According to the Great Russian Encyclopedia, modern Khoton people are part of the "Mongols — a group of peoples who speak Mongolian languages".

History and culture

Khoton or Khotong was originally a Mongol term for Muslim Uyghur and Hui people, or Chinese language-speaking Muslims.

The Khotons were settled in Mongolia by the Oirats when the latter conquered Xinjiang and took their city-dwelling ancestors to Mongolia. According to another version, they settled in Mongolia after 1753, when their leader, the Dörbet Prince Tseren Ubashi, surrendered to the Qing Dynasty. According to some scholars, the Khotons are Mongolized Uyghurs as a result.

Unlike most Mongolians, Khotons follow a syncretic form of Islam that incorporates Buddhist and traditional elements (like Tengrism). They traditionally avoid intermarriage with other ethnic groups.

Language 
Khotons originally spoke a Turkic language. It was spoken up until the 19th century.

Bibliography
The Khotons of Western Mongolia, 1979.

See also
Khoton (redirect page)
Demographics of Mongolia

References 

Ethnic groups in Mongolia
Oirats
Dzungar Khanate
Turkic Buddhists
Turkic peoples of Asia